Arc Records, owned by founder Phil G. Anderson through his Arc Sound holding company, was a record label based in Toronto, Ontario, Canada. Some of the artists to have their work released on the label include the Abbey Tavern Singers, Terry Black, Dublin Corporation and Marg Osburne.

Background 
Phil G. Anderson started the company's operations in April 1958, originally oriented to providing Canadian promotion, merchandising and distribution for other labels. Arc started manufacturing its own records in 1959. As of 1968, the president was Anderson and the vice-president was Bill Gilliland. That year the label announced its plans to enter the international market.

In 1965, the label released a single called "The Klan". It contained the lyrics, "Now, he who travels with the Klan, he is a monster, not a man". It was announced in the June 12 issue of Billboard that prominent political figures, including civil rights movement leader Martin Luther King Jr., were to receive copies of the single. There had been an effort to promote the single. The band behind this anti-Klan single was The Brothers-in-Law with their The Brothers-In-Law Strike Again album.

In 1967, the label had an injunction brought against them restraining them from the manufacture and distribution of "This Land Is Your Land", which was a parody of the Woody Guthrie tune.

Besides the aforementioned artists, Arc Sound signed and produced many other top Canadian recording artists in the 1960s, such as Anne Murray, Stitch In Tyme, Catherine McKinnon, Fred McKenna, Harry Hibbs, Ronnie Hawkins, The Travellers and the Ugly Ducklings. One of their biggest successes was the Canadian release of "We're Off to Dublin in the Green" by the Abbey Tavern Singers. The group was an Irish band but became enormously popular in Canada, as the song reached #2 on Canada's CHUM Charts and sold close to 150,000 copies in Canada within the first year of release.

In the early 1970s, Arc Sound became a subsidiary of AHED (acronym for Arc Home Entertainment Diversified), a music technology company (main product line was the GBX amplifier) owned by Anderson. AHED, including Arc Records and Arc Sound, ceased operations in 1986 due to the slow Canadian economy and changes in the music industry.

References

Defunct record labels of Canada
Budget record labels